Rebecca More (born 7 August 1980) is an English pornographic actress and model. More has been acting in pornographic films since 2010. She found internet fame in October 2018 after she and fellow porn star Sophie Anderson, who brand themselves "The Cock Destroyers", posted a video that went viral. Both her and Anderson's videos have become memes and the pair have subsequently been regarded as 'gay icons'.

Personal life 
Before working in the adult industry, More obtained a law degree from the University of West London. She briefly worked for the Citizens Advice Bureau and has two children. She began working as  a stripper and later as an escort in order to earn more money. More has size 34GG breasts.

Career
More began her pornographic career in 2010 and has since appeared in over 150 pornographic films for multiple studios including Brazzers, Bang Bros, Digital Playground, Fake Taxi, Girlfriends Films and Television X. She has appeared in several scenes with Jordi El Niño Polla and Keiran Lee. More also has her own OnlyFans page, for which she posts sexual content throughout the week and broadcasts live to her fans.

In October 2018, a video of More and fellow pornographic actress Sophie Anderson calling themselves "The Cock Destroyers" while promoting a gang bang went viral. Their sudden popularity within the LGBT community saw them obtain an internet following and they made appearances at nightclubs such as G-A-Y. In October 2019, More and Anderson, featured in a non-sex role in A Tale Of Two Cock Destroyers, a gay pornographic film for Men.com which starred actors Jonas Jackson, JJ Knight, Leander, Joey Mills, Ty Mitchell and Johnny Rapid. and in 2020 they presented Slag Wars: The Next Destroyer alongside Matthew Camp, a reality television competition series on their quest to discover who will be named The Next Cock Destroyer. In 2021, More and Anderson fell out, resulting in an indefinite hiatus of the Cock Destroyers.

In 2020, she served as an adult film advisor on the four-part Channel 4 television drama Adult Material.

Impact on popular culture 
Audio clips of More and Anderson were featured on the King Princess remix "cock destroyer", released on 4 March 2019 through SoundCloud.

During a girl group challenge on the first series of RuPaul's Drag Race UK, drag queens Baga Chipz, Blu Hydrangea and Divina de Campo named themselves the "Frock Destroyers" after More and Anderson's meme.

During the first season of Canada's Drag Race, contestant Ilona Verley impersonated More for the Snatch Game challenge, making her the first pornographic film actress to be impersonated in the challenge.

Awards and nominations 
 2018 – XBIZ Europa Awards: Best Sex Scene – Glamcore for Malice Before Daylight – Nominated

References

External links 
 
 
UK Swingers

1980 births
Living people
Actresses from London
English pornographic film actresses
Alumni of the University of West London
British Internet celebrities